Matthew James Welsh  (born 18 November 1976) is an Australian swimmer who is the former world champion in the backstroke and butterfly. He took two golds in 50-meter butterfly and 50-meter backstroke, during one hour, at the World Championships in Shanghai 2006. Welsh retired from professional swimming in March 2008 when he failed to secure a place in the team for the Beijing Olympics.

Early years
Welsh started swimming in his final years at Scotch College, Melbourne and moved into competitive swimming in 1995 after leaving school at the age of eighteen. He trained under coach Ian Pope at the Melbourne Vicentre Club.  His first big break came in 1998 at the world swimming championships in Perth, Western Australia with a gold in the 4x100-metre medley relay.

World and Olympic accomplishments

At 31 and after 11 years on the Australian Swim Team, Welsh was unable to beat the younger generation at the trials and was not selected to compete at the 2008 Summer Olympics in Beijing.

Swimming-history
Welsh has won several world championship titles in both backstroke and butterfly. He first broke the Australian record in the 100-metre backstroke in 1998. He also won more Australian swimming titles than any swimmer in history, claiming his 50th win at the 2006 Australian titles in Brisbane in December 2006.

Personal life

Welsh married Lauren Newton, the daughter of Bert and Patti Newton, and sister of Matthew Newton, on 4 November 2006. They are parents to six children born between January 2008 and August 2020.

Awards and honors
Australian Sports Medal in 2000.
Medal of the Order of Australia (OAM) in 2013 for services swimming and charity work.

See also
 List of Commonwealth Games medallists in swimming (men)
 List of Olympic medalists in swimming (men)
 World record progression 50 metres backstroke
 World record progression 50 metres butterfly
 World record progression 200 metres backstroke

References

External links
 
 Elite Sports
 

1976 births
Living people
Australian male backstroke swimmers
Australian male butterfly swimmers
Swimmers from Melbourne
Olympic swimmers of Australia
Swimmers at the 2000 Summer Olympics
Swimmers at the 2004 Summer Olympics
Olympic silver medalists for Australia
Olympic bronze medalists for Australia
Commonwealth Games silver medallists for Australia
Commonwealth Games gold medallists for Australia
Swimmers at the 2002 Commonwealth Games
Swimmers at the 2006 Commonwealth Games
World record setters in swimming
People educated at Scotch College, Melbourne
Olympic bronze medalists in swimming
World Aquatics Championships medalists in swimming
Recipients of the Medal of the Order of Australia
Recipients of the Australian Sports Medal
Medalists at the FINA World Swimming Championships (25 m)
Medalists at the 2000 Summer Olympics
Olympic silver medalists in swimming
Commonwealth Games medallists in swimming
Goodwill Games medalists in swimming
Competitors at the 2001 Goodwill Games
Medallists at the 2002 Commonwealth Games
Medallists at the 2006 Commonwealth Games